Scandinavian Australians are Australian citizens whose origins are found in any of the Nordic countries, or people from any of these countries who live in Australia. Danish immigrants made up the largest group by far. Although Finland is significantly different culturally from other Scandinavian countries and as such is not usually counted among them, it is still counted as one in the Australian censuses for the sake of statistics.

Countries of origin 
This is a list of the countries of origin. The numbers indicate the people born in their home countries and people born in Australia of Scandinavian descent.

Icelandic Australians 
These citizens are Australian of Icelandic ancestry, or persons born in Iceland residing in Australia. The largest emigration from Iceland to Australia took place in the late 1960's, when the Australian government offered immigrants financial assistance at a time when the employment situation in Iceland was bleak. There were 980 residents who reported Icelandic ancestry in the 2011 census. They form the smallest part of the wider Scandinavian Australian group usually included in the census.

See also 
Europeans in Oceania
Immigration to Australia

References 

 
Australia